Eric Thompson (1929–1982) was a British actor, husband of Phyllida Law and father of Emma Thompson.

Eric Thompson may also refer to:

 J. Eric S. Thompson (1898–1975), English archaeologist
 Eric Thompson (cricketer) (1938–1992), Scottish cricketer
 Eric Thompson (racing driver) (1919–2015), British race car driver
 Eric Thompson (cyclist) (1927–1996), British Olympic cyclist
 Eric Thompson (basketball) (born 1993), American basketball player
 Erik Thompson (born 1959), American voice actor and television announcer